Skyscraper Soul is the third album by Jim Cuddy. It was released on September 27, 2011.

Track listing
All songs written by Jim Cuddy.
"Skyscraper Soul" — 5:02
"Regular Days" — 3:55
"Everyone Watched The Wedding" — 5:32
"Still Want You" — 4:31
"Wash Me Down" — 4:51
"Watch Yourself Go Down" — 5:33
"Don't Know That Much" — 1:48
"Banks of the 49" — 5:12
"What Is So Wrong" — 4:36
"Ready To Fall" — 4:43
"Water's Running High" — 4:24
"How In The World" — 3:41
"City Birds" (instrumental) — 2:05
"With You" — 5:03

Track Trivia
"Everyone Watched The Wedding" was inspired by the wedding of Prince William and Kate Middleton

Personnel (from CD notes)
Jim Cuddy - Vocals, guitars, harmonica, piano
Basil Donovan - Bass
Colin Cripps - Guitar, mandoguitar, slide guitar, dobro, vocals
Steve O'Connor - Piano, organ
Joel Anderson - Drums, percussion
Anne Lindsay - Violin, nyckelharpa

Chart performance

References

2011 albums
Jim Cuddy albums